Jans T. Dykhouse (December 9, 1889 – May 24, 1981) was an American politician.

Born in Hastings, Nebraska, on December 9, 1889, Dykehouse was raised in Lyon County, Iowa, where his family had moved in 1892. He graduated from Rock Rapids High School and the University of Dubuque. After completing his college education in 1916, Dykehouse worked as a banker for fifteen years, and subsequently diversified his business interests into real estate, insurance, and farming.

Dykhouse was affiliated with the Republican Party. He won election to the Iowa House of Representatives in 1936 and 1938, serving District 99. Dykhouse contested the 1940 Iowa Senate election, and won the District 49 seat for a single four-year term. He was reelected to the Iowa Senate five times thereafter, as the legislator representing District 24.

Dykhouse attended the Rock Rapids United Methodist Church. He married Little Rock native Dora Getting in October 1917, with whom he raised three children. He died on May 24, 1981, in Rock Rapids, Iowa at age 91.

References

1889 births
1981 deaths
Republican Party members of the Iowa House of Representatives
Republican Party Iowa state senators
American bankers
Farmers from Iowa
Businesspeople from Iowa
20th-century American businesspeople
American real estate businesspeople
American businesspeople in insurance
University of Dubuque alumni
People from Rock Rapids, Iowa
People from Hastings, Nebraska
Methodists from Iowa
20th-century American politicians